These hits topped the Dutch Top 40 in 1973.

See also
1973 in music

References

1973 in the Netherlands
1973 record charts
1973